Red Bud or Redbud may refer to:

Places
Red Bud, Georgia, community in USA
Red Bud, Illinois, city in USA
Redbud, Kentucky

Plants
Cercis or Redbud tree
Cercis canadensis, Eastern redbud
Cercis occidentalis, Western redbud

Other uses
Redbud Woods controversy, dispute at Cornell University, USA
USCGC Redbud (WLB-398), US Coast Guard ship
Red Bud MX a motocross track in Buchanan, Michigan, USA